The term Oberliga Berlin may describe any one of several historical upper-tier level football competitions based in the city of Berlin, Germany.

 Brandenburg football championship, refers to any of several early (1898–1923) first division competitions known by various names, but sometimes referred to as the Oberliga Berlin or Oberliga Berlin-Brandenburg
 Oberliga Berlin-Brandenburg, the first division competition active 1923–1933
 Gauliga Berlin-Brandenburg, the first division competition established under the Third Reich and active 1933–1945
 Oberliga Berlin (1945–63), the first tier competition active in West Berlin 1945–1963
 Amateur-Oberliga Berlin, the second and third tier competitions active in West Berlin 1947–1991